Omar Bertazzo (born 7 January 1989 in Este) is an Italian former professional cyclist.

Major results

2009
 Vuelta a Tenerife
1st Stages 2 & 5
2011
 1st OCBC Cycle Singapore
2012
 6th Grand Prix de Fourmies
 7th Coppa Sabatini
2013
 1st Stage 8 Tour of Austria
 1st  Points classification Vuelta a Venezuela
 4th La Roue Tourangelle
 4th Classic Loire Atlantique
 5th Route Adélie
2014
 9th Ronde van Limburg
 10th Ronde van Zeeland Seaports

References

External links

1989 births
Living people
Italian male cyclists
Cyclists from the Province of Padua